University of Djelfa is a university located in Djelfa, Algeria. Under President Abdelaziz Bouteflika, it was upgraded from a university center to a university on October 13, 2008.

See also 
 Djelfa
 University of Djelfa (Arabic)
 List of universities in Algeria

External links
University guide on the official page:
 Official website

 
1961 establishments in Algeria